Shitala Mata Mandir or Shitala Devi Mandir is a  temple of Shitala Mata  situated at Patna City, Patna in Bihar state of India. This is place for worship of Mata Durga also known as shakti peeth of Maa Durga.

References

Hindu temples in Bihar
Durga temples
Religious buildings and structures in Patna